Sir William Lowther, 1st Baronet (4 January 1676 – 6 April 1705) was an English landowner from Marske-by-the-Sea, Yorkshire. He was the eldest son of Anthony Lowther and Margaret Penn, daughter of Sir William Penn.

On 15 June 1697, he was created a baronet.

He married Catherine Preston and had three children:
Sir Thomas Lowther, 2nd Baronet (1699–1745)
Catherine Lowther
Margaret Lowther

References
Burke, John, and Bernard Burke. A Genealogical and Heraldic History of the Extinct and Dormant Baronetcies of England, Ireland, and Scotland. Baltimore: Genealogical Pub. Co, 1977.googlebooks.com Retrieved 3 November 2007
Lowther pedigree 1

Baronets in the Baronetage of England
English MPs 1702–1705
1676 births
1705 deaths
English landowners
William